Neil Chamberlain (born 24 April 1955) is a former Australian rules footballer who played with Melbourne in the Victorian Football League (VFL).

Chamberlain, from East Malvern, had his most productive year in 1974, playing nine senior games.

He spent most of his time in the reserves and won the 1975 Gardiner Medal, three votes clear of second placed Gerry Lynn.

After leaving Melbourne he played for Camberwell in the Victorian Football Association.

References

1955 births
Australian rules footballers from Victoria (Australia)
Melbourne Football Club players
Camberwell Football Club players
Living people